The Lottery Winners are an indie pop band from Leigh, Greater Manchester, England. The band was put together for record label Modern Sky in 2008 by Thom Rylance (vocals/guitar), Robert Lally (guitar/vocals), Katie Lloyd :) (bass/vocals), and Joe Singleton (drums).

History
Formed in 2008, original drummer Alex Langford-Taylor was subsequently replaced by long-time friend Joe Singleton, otherwise the line-up has stayed constant since then. The band recorded their debut album The Art of Communication in 2011; it was mentioned by Alan Jones in Music Week, that the Official Charts Company has never had a sale recorded for this title in the last 10 years since its release. Their 2016 song "Young Love" was called a "solid slice of catchy, jingly-jangly, indie-pop" by CDNX.

That same year, they were chosen to support Starsailor at a gig in Wigan as both bands shared the same booking agency, despite local Wigan acts later told they had the chance to play.

The Lottery Winners signed to Modern Sky UK in 2019. They released their first single, "Hawaii", with the label in September 2019.

Their self-titled studio album reached number 23 on the UK Albums Chart in March 2020 which was followed by a covers album called Sounds of Isolation which featured versions of tracks made famous by Rick Astley, Oasis, Joy Division, the Smiths and the Housemartins.

In 2021, the Lottery Winners announced their Start Again EP, which would feature Frank Turner on the title track and Sleeper on "Bad Things" (an R&B-laced indie-pop track, which features vocals from that band's singer Louise Wener).

On 10 December 2021, the band charted on the Official Albums Chart Top 100 at number 11 with their third album Something to Leave the House For, after putting out 20 versions of the album, which sold a total of 8,339 copies in the week prior to the chart being published.

On 22 December 2022, the band performed its first sell-out concert at a major venue at Albert Hall, Manchester, England.

Discography

Albums
 The Art of Communication (2011)
 The Lottery Winners (13 March 2020) No. 23 UK
 Sounds of Isolation (21 August 2020) No. 41UK
 Something to Leave the House For (3 December 2021) No. 11 UK

Singles
"Elizabeth" (April 2013)
"I Know" (October 2015)
"Young Love" (April 2016)
"That's Not Entertainment" (November 2018)
"Hawaii" (September 2019)
"Little Things" (November 2019)
"21" (January 2020)
"Headlock" (February 2020)
"The Meaning of Life" (March 2020)
"Love Will Keep Us Together" (April 2020)
"An Open Letter to Creatives" (November 2020)
"Start Again" (feat. Frank Turner) (January 2021)
"Rockstar" (with Nickelback) (February 2021)
"Bad Things" (feat. Sleeper) (February 2021)

References

External links
 Lottery Winners official website

Musical groups established in 2008
Musical groups from Greater Manchester
Musical quartets
British indie pop groups
Sire Records artists
Warner Records artists